A protoform may refer to:
 a putative word that historical linguists have reconstructed in a specific proto-language, by following principles of the Comparative method.

 an element of the fictional universe of Transformers. It is the building blocks of all life on Cybertron in Transformers Animated.